The Campeonato Uruguayo de Rugby, also known as Uruguayo de Rugby, is the main competition of Uruguayan rugby union league system. It includes the first, second and third division competitions. It was played for the first time in 1950.

History 
Rugby was introduced to Uruguay as early as the late 19th century, but did not really take off in formal terms until the mid-20th. The spur for this was Carlos E. Cat, who helped establish the Club Championship in 1950, and would become the first president of the URU in January 1951. The first Club Championship was contested by Old Boys, Colonia Rugby, and multisport clubs such as Montevideo Cricket Club (MVCC) and Carrasco Polo (which supplied two XVs). This was successful enough to lead to the establishment of the Uruguayan Rugby Union on 31 January 1951, with Cat as president.

Over the years, various other clubs would join the Championship, including Los Cuervos (the Crows) at the end of the 1950s, Old Christians at the beginning of the 1960s, as well as Champagnat and El Trébol de Paysandú in the 1970s, and Pucaru in the early 1990s, as well as La Cachila, Trouville, and Colonia Rowing.

Current teams
There are 11 clubs participating in the 2021 championship:

Notes

Champions

Titles by club

Bibliography
 Richards, Huw A Game for Hooligans: The History of Rugby Union (Mainstream Publishing, Edinburgh, 2007)

References

External links
 

Rugby union leagues in Uruguay
Sports leagues established in 1950
1950 establishments in Uruguay
Rugby union